Guerrilla Homes was a four-part programme, which aired on BBC Three in 2004, presented by Charlie Luxton, an Australian born architect, featuring alternative, non-conformist ways people can house themselves in Britain in the 21st Century.

It was hailed at the time as a prime instance of the innovative success of BBC Three.

External links
 BBC Press Office Article August 2004
 BBC Press Office Release – Autumn 2004 highlights

BBC Television shows